Amanda Dawn Felder (born 16 January 1982 in Houston) is a professional US triathlete and Member of the USA Triathlon Project 2016 program.

Felder started her triathlon career in 2005 when she took part in, and won, the USA Triathlon Collegiate National Championship for the first time, as later on in 2008.
Felder also takes part in Ironmen, e.g. she placed 7th at the Ironman 70.3 Miami on 30 October 2010.

Amanda Felder holds an undergraduate degree from Rice University and in March 2010 she was awarded a Ph.D. in Bioengineering from UC (University of California) San Diego.
Felder resides in Cupertino.

ITU Competitions 

The following list is based upon the official ITU rankings and the athlete's Profile Page. All competitions are triathlons and belong to the Elite category.

DNS = did not start · DNF = did not finish

References

External links 

 Amanda Felder's webpage
 US Triathlon Federation: Felder's profile page

American female triathletes
1982 births
Rice University alumni
University of California, San Diego alumni
People from Houston
Living people
21st-century American women